Zsófia Konkoly (born 12 March 2002) is a Hungarian Paralympic swimmer.

Career
She represented Hungary at the 2016 Summer Paralympics and won a bronze medal in the 100 metre butterfly S9 event. At the 2020 Summer Paralympics, she won a silver medal in the 400 metre freestyle S9 event. In September 2016, she received the Hungarian Bronze Cross of Merit.

She won two gold medals and a silver medal at the 2022 World Para Swimming Championships held in Madeira.

References

External links 
 

Living people
2002 births
Hungarian female freestyle swimmers
Paralympic swimmers of Hungary
Paralympic silver medalists for Hungary
Paralympic bronze medalists for Hungary
Paralympic medalists in swimming
Swimmers at the 2016 Summer Paralympics
Swimmers at the 2020 Summer Paralympics
Medalists at the 2016 Summer Paralympics
Medalists at the 2020 Summer Paralympics
Medalists at the World Para Swimming Championships
Medalists at the World Para Swimming European Championships
Place of birth missing (living people)
Hungarian female butterfly swimmers
Hungarian female backstroke swimmers
Hungarian female medley swimmers
S9-classified Paralympic swimmers